The War Department (WD) "Austerity" 2-8-0 is a type of heavy freight steam locomotive that was introduced in 1943 for war service. A total of 935 were built, making this one of the most-produced classes of British steam locomotive. They were nicknamed Ozzies by the railwaymen.

Overview 
The Austerity 2-8-0 was based on the LMS Class 8F, which until that point had been the government's standard design. Various modifications were made to the 8F design by R.A. Riddles in order to prioritise low cost over design life.  These included a boiler of simpler construction which was parallel rather than tapered and a round-topped firebox rather than a Belpaire firebox.  The firebox was made of steel rather than the rarer and more expensive copper.

The North British Locomotive Company (NBL) of Glasgow built 545 (split between their two works at Hyde Park and Queen's Park) and the Vulcan Foundry (VF) of Newton-le-Willows, Lancashire, built 390.  North British also built a larger 2-10-0 version.

WD nos. 800–879 were ordered as LMS Class 8F. No. 9312, the last one built, was named Vulcan when new. NBL builder's plates were not all in correct sequence, and were mixed up between the two works as well as between batches. All locomotives had their WD numbers increased by 70000 prior to shipping to mainland Europe; those completed after 5 September 1944 carried their 70000 series numbers from new. All but three (WD nos. 77223, 77369 and 79250) saw service with the British Army in mainland Europe after D-Day.

Post-war disposal 
After the end of the conflict, the War Department disposed of 930 locomotives (Two engines being retained by the War Department and three being scrapped).

200 were sold to the LNER, which classified them as "Class O7" and numbered them 3000–3199. In 1948, 533 more were purchased by the British Transport Commission.

With the formation of British Railways, the 733 locomotives were renumbered into the 90000–90732 series. Only one of those, No. 90732, was named, becoming Vulcan, after the Vulcan Foundry where many of the locomotives were built.

In 1946, 12 were exported to the British colony of Hong Kong to work the Kowloon–Canton Railway. Six were scrapped in 1956, but the final two survived until September 1962.

The other 184 locomotives remained in mainland Europe, mostly working in and around the Netherlands for Nederlandse Spoorwegen.

Finally, one went to the USATC in an exchange for an USATC S160 Class locomotive in the postwar exchange of WD and USATC locomotives.

Postwar WD service 

Two locomotives continued to be held in WD stock, seeing service on the Longmoor Military Railway in Hampshire, along with two of the WD Austerity 2-10-0s and other smaller locomotives. In the WD 1957 renumbering scheme, they were renumbered 400/1. Details were as follows:

Accidents and incidents
Soham rail disaster: On 2 June 1944, WD locomotive No. 7337 was hauling a freight train which caught fire as it approached , Cambridgeshire. The train consisted of 51 wagons carrying bombs. The train was divided behind the burning wagon, with the front portion being taken forward with the intention of isolating the wagon in open countryside. Its cargo detonated at Soham station, killing the fireman and the Soham signalman and injuring the train's driver and guard. Soham station was severely damaged, but the line was re-opened within eighteen hours. For their actions, Benjamin Gimbert and James Nightall were awarded George Crosses.
On 16 August 1945, WD locomotives 77125 and 77238 were involved in a head-on collision near Kleve, North Rhine-Westphalia, West Germany. Both locomotives were scrapped.
On 6 November 1945, NS 4485 (ex WD 77183) was seriously damaged after a head-on collision between a single locomotive (no pilot and driver refused to wait) coming from Kleve and SL66 coming from Groesbeek near Kranenburg, North Rhine-Westphalia, West Germany. The locomotive was send for repairs to the workshop in Mechelen (B) but, on September 26, 1946it was sent to Roosendaal (NL) and written off there on 15 January 1947.
On 26 January 1945, NS 4504 (ex WD 78693) was seriously damaged after a head-on collision between RF39 and train 4505 on the single track railwaybridge in Ravenstein. The locomotive was sent for repairs at the workshop in Mechelen (B) but, on September 26, 1946, was eventually sent to Roosendaal (NL) and written off there on 15 January 1947.
On 17 September 1950, WD locomotive No. 77195 ran away from Neville Hill Locomotive Shed, Leeds, Yorkshire and subsequently crashed through buffers at Marsh Lane Goods Yard, Leeds.
An express freight train ran into the wreckage and was derailed.

Preservation 

One WD 2-8-0 has survived. Vulcan Foundry works No. 5200 was repatriated from Sweden to the Keighley and Worth Valley Railway. It was SJ Class G11 number 1931. It was overhauled to its original condition, finished in 2007, which involved building a new cab and tender, to become BR "No. 90733". After test runs, 90733 ran its first passenger train on Monday 23 July 2007.

Gallery

See also
BR ex-WD Austerity 2-8-0 - locomotives of the class taken into British Rail service
WD Austerity 2-10-0 - a similar but larger design

References 

 Rowledge, J.W.P. Heavy Goods Engines of the War Department Vol. 3 Austerity 2-8-0 and 2-10-0

External links 

 LNER O7 locomotives

2-8-0 locomotives
War Department locomotives
NBL locomotives
Vulcan Foundry locomotives
Railway locomotives introduced in 1943
Standard gauge steam locomotives of Great Britain
Steam locomotives of the Netherlands
Steam locomotives of Sweden
Steam locomotives of Hong Kong
Steam locomotives of China
Standard gauge locomotives of the Netherlands
Standard gauge locomotives of Sweden
Standard gauge locomotives of Hong Kong
Standard gauge locomotives of China